Meiraba Luwang Maisnam (born 30 December 2002) is an Indian badminton player. He currently trains at Prakash Padukone Badminton Academy.

Achievements

BWF International Challenge/Series (4 titles) 
Men's singles

  BWF International Challenge tournament
  BWF International Series tournament
  BWF Future Series tournament

BWF Junior International (4 titles, 1 runner-up) 
Boys' singles

  BWF Junior International Grand Prix tournament
  BWF Junior International Challenge tournament
  BWF Junior International Series tournament
  BWF Junior Future Series tournament

Performance timeline

Individual competitions 
 Senior level

References

External links 
 

2002 births
Living people
People from Imphal
Racket sportspeople from Manipur
Indian male badminton players
21st-century Indian people